Craspedorhachis is a genus of African plants in the grass family.

 Species
 Craspedorhachis africana Benth. - Madagascar, Mozambique, Malawi, Zambia, Zimbabwe, Namibia, Limpopo
 Craspedorhachis digitata Kupicha & Cope - Zimbabwe
 Craspedorhachis rhodesiana Rendle - Angola, Zambia, Zimbabwe, Mozambique, Botswana, Namibia

 formerly included
Several names have been coined with the name Craspedorhachis but refer to species now considered better suited to other genera (Dinebra Trigonochloa and Willkommia). Here are links to help you find more information.
 Craspedorhachis menyharthii - Trigonochloa uniflora 
 Craspedorhachis perrieri - Dinebra perrieri  
 Craspedorhachis sarmentosa - Willkommia sarmentosa 
 Craspedorhachis texana - Willkommia texana  
 Craspedorhachis uniflora - Trigonochloa uniflora

References

Chloridoideae
Flora of Africa
Poaceae genera